, born Tsunejirō Uchida on 26 April 1898, was a Japanese film director. The stage name "Tomu" translates to “spit out dreams”.

Early career
Uchida started out at the Taikatsu studio in the early 1920s, but came to prominence at Nikkatsu, adapting literary works with the screenwriter Yasutarō Yagi in a realist style. His 1929 film A Living Puppet (Ikeru ningyo) was selected as the fourth best film of the year by the film journal, Kinema Junpo. Many of his 1930s films featured the actor Isamu Kosugi. One such work, Policeman (Keisatsukan), has been called "a tremendously stylish gangster movie about the love-hate relationship between a cop and a criminal, once childhood friends". It is Uchida’s only surviving complete silent film. Uchida borrows from Hollywood gangster films and expressionist techniques in a story of a young policeman tracking down an old friend who is now a criminal. His work from the 1920 and 1930s possess a leftist social commentary and were often some of the most critically acclaimed films of the time. Kinema Junpo selected Jinsei Gekijo as the number two film of 1936, Kagirinaki Zenshin as the best film of 1937, and Tsuchi as the best film of 1939. The latter was praised for its realistic depiction of the lives of poor Meiji-period tenant farmers. Unfortunately, few of Uchida's prewar works survive in their entirety.

In 1941, Uchida quit the Nikkatsu studio, and after failing to start his own production company, in 1943 began to work with the Manchukuo Film Association, although he never completed a film there. In 1945 he was taken prisoner and held in Manchuria until 1954, when he returned to Japan.

Postwar career
Upon he return, he joined the Toei studio. His post-war movies reveal a strong genre stylist with no immediately discernible themes, much like many golden-age Hollywood directors. Uchida effortlessly directed chamber dramas, comedies, and samurai epics, often in color, and with a forward-looking dose of irony.

His first film after returning, Bloody Spear at Mount Fuji (Chiyari Fuji) (1955), was an adventure about a samurai and his servant on a trip to Edo. In a sly bit of subversion, the peasants are more intelligent than the drunken samurai. The final battle in a courtyard amidst punctured sake barrels is considered a highlight of Uchida's career. According to the critic Craig Watts, “Both progressive and nostalgic, humanistic and nationalistic, peaceful and violent, Blood Spear, Mt. Fuji, like the Japanese experience in Manchuria, is an aggressive conglomeration of extremes." In Twilight Saloon (Tasogare Sakaba) (1955), which dealt with post-war fears in a lighter tone than A Hole of My Own Making, Uchida views a cross-section of Japanese life over the course of one night in a tavern. Dancers take the stage, a singing contest is held, and old soldiers reminisce. At the corner of the bar is an artist drowning himself in drink, who acts as the film’s narrator (and Uchida’s alter ego) in this gently humorous film. The journal Cinema Scope said that, “Resembling a poetic-realist version of Casablanca (1942), the film is a naturalistic tour de force.”

The Outsiders (Mori to Mizuumi no Matsuri) (1958) was one of Uchida’s most socially conscious films. It looks at the Ainu, an indigenous people who live on the island of Hokkaido and were often portrayed as vicious savages (much like Native Americans in Westerns). As the hero of the film challenges an owner to prove his own Ainu heritage, the film raises questions about the necessity of preserving a culture. In the words of the critic Jasper Sharp: “Bold, beautiful, and packing a powerful dramatic punch, there is little else quite like it.” In The Master Spearman (Sake To Onna To Yari) (1960) a shogun kills himself, and rituals dictate that his samurai must also commit seppuku; however one young ronin refuses to follow this code and retreats to the country, only to be lured back into the service of the spear. Uchida gently tweaks audience expectations, as a character bemoans a crowd’s blood-lust, only to reward them with a violent ending.

Many of Uchida's postwar works were engaged less in social realism than in cinematic experimentation. Experimenting with incorporating kabuki and bunraku puppets Chikamatsu’s Love in Osaka (Naniwa No Koi No Monogatari) (1959) followed a young man who falls in love with a prostitute, vowing to rescue her from the brothel. Not content with adapting the play, Uchida made the playwright Chikamatsu a character in the drama who moves from observer to narrator to participant as the tragedy unfolds in somewhat postmodern fashion. That film ended up number seven on Kinema Junpo'''s best ten list. Hero of the Red-Light District (Yoto Monogatari: Hana No Yoshiwara Hyakunin Giri) (1960), about a wealthy businessman with a disfigured face who seems unable to find love until he meets a conniving prostitute out to win his fortune, features a violent end in a shower of cherry blossoms. To Alexander Jacoby, “The violent climax is, once again, directed with breathtaking assurance; it is, in fact, perhaps the single most brilliant scene in Uchida’s oeuvre.” The Mad Fox (Koi Ya Koi Nasuna Koi) (1962) was a full-on avant-garde classic that mixed kabuki and animation with location and studio work. A man tormented by the death of his wife meets her twin sister and a fox spirit who takes the form of his beloved. The story was just an excuse for Uchida to challenge the form and function of cinema in a tribute to Japanese folk tales. Toronto's Now Magazine declared that it was one of the weirdest films in any language....Torture, murder and possible bestiality—is only the beginning of this hallucinatory fairy tale’s trippy charm.”A Fugitive from the Past (Kiga Kaikyo) (1965) is considered his masterpiece. Adapted from the novel Kiga Kaikyo (1962) by Tsutomu Minakami and often compared to Kurosawa's High and Low (1963), this examination of criminal life in post-war Japan is split into three sections: the criminal on the run, an interlude with a prostitute, and the final confrontation with police. The grainy widescreen cinematography results from Uchida’s unusual choice to shoot in 16mm and blow up to 35mm. It was voted the sixth greatest Japanese film ever made by Kinema Jumpo in 1995, and the third greatest Japanese film in the same magazine in 1999.

Uchida died in 1970 of cancer.

Reception
In April 2008 the cinematheque at the Brooklyn Academy of Music presented the first comprehensive retrospective of the long overlooked Japanese director in the United States.

 Selected filmography 
 History of Crab Temple (Kanimanji engi) (1924)
 A Living Puppet (Ikeru Ningyo) (1929)
 Policeman (Keisatsukan) (1933)
 Jinsei Gekijo (1936)
 Kagirinaki Zenshin (1937)
 Hadaka no Machi (1937)
 Tsuchi (1939)
 Bloody Spear at Mount Fuji (Chiyari Fuji) (1955)
 A Hole of My Own Making (Jibun No Ana No Naka De) (1955)
 Twilight Saloon (Tasogare Sakaba) (1955)
 The Kuroda Affair (Kuroda sōdō) (1956)
 Swords in the Moonlight or The Great Bodhisattva Pass (Daibosatsu Toge) (1957)
 The Outsiders (Mori to Mizuumi no Matsuri) (1958)
 Chikamatsu’s Love in Osaka (Naniwa No Koi No Monogatari) (1959)
 Hero of the Red-Light District, a.k.a. Yoshiwara: The Pleasure Quarter (Yoto Monogatari: Hana No Yoshiwara Hyakunin Giri) (1960) (Also known as Killing in Yoshiwara)
 The Master Spearman (Sake To Onna To Yari) (1960)
 Miyamoto Musashi (1961 film), 5-part, 10-hour film starring Nakamura Kinnosuke
 The Mad Fox (Koi Ya Koi Nasuna Koi) (1962)
 A Fugitive From the Past (Kiga Kaikyo'') (1965)

References

External links 
  
 Tomu Uchida's grave
 
 

Japanese film directors
Samurai film directors
1898 births
1970 deaths